Hao Feng-ming (born 19 September 1959) is a Taiwanese politician. He has served as the Political Deputy Minister of Labor since 17 February 2014.

Education
Hao received his bachelor's degree in law from the National Chung Hsing University. He obtained his master's and doctoral degrees in law from the Universite de Droit in France.

Early career
Hao held several positions in the academia, such as the Vice President, Professor and Dean of the Law Department at National Chung Cheng University and a lecturer at the Judges and Prosecutors Training Institute of the Ministry of Justice.

Political career
At the central government, he has held several positions, such as the committee of the Examination and Review of Labor Insurance Disputes of the Council of Labor Affairs, member of the Committee of the Management of National Health Insurance Fund of the Department of Health and member of the Committee on Attorney Certification Examination Review of the Ministry of Examination of the Examination Yuan.

At the regional government, he was the member of the Legal Affairs Committee of the Chiayi City Government and member of the Petition and Appeal Committee of the Taichung County Government.

See also
 Executive Yuan

References

Taiwanese Ministers of Labor
Living people
1959 births
National Chung Hsing University alumni
Academic staff of the National Chung Cheng University
Place of birth missing (living people)